Stretton Hall may refer to the following structures:

Stretton Hall, Cheshire
Stretton Lower Hall, in Cheshire
Stretton Old Hall, in Cheshire
Stretton Hall, Leicestershire
Stretton Hall, Staffordshire

Architectural disambiguation pages